The 1997–98 Japan Ice Hockey League season was the 32nd season of the Japan Ice Hockey League. Six teams participated in the league, and Kokudo Ice Hockey Club won the championship.

Regular season

Playoffs

External links
 Japan Ice Hockey Federation

Japan
Japan
Japan Ice Hockey League seasons
Japan